1972 Special Olympics was the third edition of the Special Olympics World Games held in Los Angeles, California, the United States, from August 13 to August 18 in 1972. This event was co-sponsored by the Joseph P. Kennedy Jr. Foundation and the Western Special Olympics, Inc. About 2,500 to 3,000 youngsters from eight countries including the United States, Canada, Mexico, and France participated. This event was held on the campuses of University of California, Los Angeles and Santa Monica College.

References 

Special Olympics
Special Olympics World Summer Games
Special Olympics World Summer Games
Sports competitions in Los Angeles
Special Olympics World Summer Games
Special Olympics World Summer Games
Special Olympics World Summer Games
Special Olympics World Summer Games
Special Olympics World Summer Games
Special Olympics World Summer Games
University of California, Los Angeles